Hæren is a Danish and Norwegian language word meaning "The Army". It may refer to:

Norwegian Army
Royal Danish Army